That Girl in Yellow Boots is a 2010 Indian Hindi-language thriller film by director Anurag Kashyap, starring Kalki Koechlin and Naseeruddin Shah. The film was first screened at the Toronto International Film Festival in September 2010, followed by the Venice Film Festival after it played in several festivals worldwide including the South Asian International Film Festival. The commercial release however took place a year later in September 2011, both in India as well as in the U.S.

Plot
Ruth (Kalki Koechlin) is a British woman who lost her sister to suicide a couple of years ago. She comes to India, to search for her father, who is of Indian descent, a man she hardly knew but cannot forget, due to a letter he had written to her, asking her to seek him out. 
Without a work permit, desperation drives her to work at a massage parlour, where she offers both standard massages and "happy endings". Torn between schisms, Mumbai becomes the alien yet strangely familiar backdrop for Ruth's quest. She struggles to find her independence and space as she is sucked deeper into the labyrinth of the city's underbelly. She also dates a drug addict Prashant (Prashant Prakash), who is simultaneously her saviour and tormentor. A city that feeds on her misery, a love that eludes her. In what is possibly also seen as a commentary on the cult of godmen in India, her father is shown to be a follower of one such religious cult. This film also shows her fighting back in vain against the shrinking feeling, as the world grows around her larger and larger everyday. While trying to make the ends meet by working at the seedy massage parlour, Ruth also contacts multiple people to get help in finding her father, like some officials and also few members of the cult. She is popular among few of the clientele, who are her daily. She becomes friends with one of them (Nazaruddin shah), who sees her only as a professional and unaware of the shady business going around. As the film proceeds, her druggie boyfriend falls indebt to another drug dealer who takes her money as payback and asks her to pay the rest through 'Happy Endings'. Ruth somehow manages to escape from him. In the meantime, in order to find her dad, she obliges to give some private services in return for the favour from an official. But before she does it, her boyfriend interrupts and hits her and she then breaks-up with him. She finally finds her dad's whereabouts through a cult member that her dad is going with a different name from his actual and that he is now staying at Versova. By bribing the staff at a post office, Ruth somehow manages to find his address. As she walks out, it is shown that someone is clicking her pictures secretly. The next day she visits her dad to find he is not at home. As she looks around she finds her childhood picture with her mum and sis but not even one picture of her dad. As she looks through the pictures she finds a box full of her latest pictures, the ones that were secretly clicked and to her shock she also finds her dad's picture on an ID hanging nearby and flees in horror. She walks around in shock all day and when she goes back to the massage parlour, her only good client found out about her secret services and confronts her by asking if she is not ashamed. Ruth stays at the parlour that night and procures a revolver pistol from the drug dealer, she fooled earlier. As the next day starts, her regular morning client Luke visits and she strikes a conversation asking him why he insists on getting services from her and as he mumbles to answer she throws the hot oil on his back. It is then revealed to our shock that Luke is her dad and he knows she is his daughter from the start and he is visiting her daily as he loves her. He also reveals that he married her mom, as he loves her step-sister Emily, the same way he loves Ruth. It is him who got Emily pregnant and her mother is aware of it and still did not get her aborted, which is why Emily committed suicide. To our horror, her dad keeps saying that he loves her as she walks out of the room. The film ends with Ruth hanging up her yellow boots, and quitting her job at the massage parlour and also presumably leaving the country to go back to Britain; her quest having come to a shocking end.

Cast
 Kalki Koechlin as Ruth
 Naseeruddin Shah as Diwakar
 Gulshan Devaiya as Chittiappa
 Shiv Kumar Subramaniam as Peter
 Mushtaq Khan
 Ronit Roy (Cameo)
 Makrand Deshpande (Cameo)
 Piyush Mishra (Cameo)
 Rajat Kapoor (Cameo)
 Divya Jagdal as Divya
 Kumud Mishra as Lynn
 Prashant Prakash as Prashant
 Pooja Swaroop as Maya
 Kartik Krishnan

Production

Development
Lead actress Kalki Koechlin who also co-wrote the film with Anurag Kashyap mentioned, "A lot of these characters were based loosely on figures that I had seen growing up in India ...Growing up as a white-skinned woman in India, I was always the odd one out – there was a certain alienation that came with that, and you end up alienating yourself because everyone comes to you like the white girl, the easy, "Baywatch," loose-moraled white girl."

Anurag Kashyap asked Koechlin to write the first scene, to get a female perspective on the treatment of white women at Indian government offices as she personally experienced the objectification. He also wanted to explore the theme of child abuse; he had previously played the role of child abuser in I Am (2010) by Onir, and he himself had been a victim of child abuse for 11 years. At the writing stage Koechlin and Kashyap disagreed on the ending initially, as Koechlin wanted an optimistic ending, unlike Kashyap who wanted to portray that "...you don't always get solutions to your problems".

The film had difficulty finding funding because it dealt with controversial themes like child abuse and drug addiction and "differed so vastly from his previous work". As Kashyap put it, "I wanted to break the formula that many directors and actors find themselves in."

Filming
The film was shot in just 13 days. It was primarily framed in tight spaces, like apartments, massage parlours, and rickshaws leading to a "claustrophobic sense of unease that permeates the entire film". Many of the cast members had previously worked together in theatre productions; this familiarity allowed the director to shoot the film in a shorter period of time. He admitted that he never "directed" any of the actors during the filming, "I've never told any actor what to do, only what not to do. You have to trust your actors, and I know mine inside and out." He found the entire filming emotionally draining and tough, especially because it was made mostly on borrowed money.

Release
After travelling to 2010 Toronto International Film Festival, 67th Venice International Film Festival in September 2010 and International Film Festival of Los Angeles (IFFLA), at its New York premiere on 24 August 2011, at the Asia Society, director Anurag Kashyap said, "I hope you feel the film, because you will not enjoy it." The film's commercial release, however, took over a year as it was delayed to coincide with its US release to avoid internet piracy. Indian distributors were not keen on the film, as without big Bollywood stars they did not find it viable for an international release; they mainly cater to an NRI (Non-resident Indian) audience. Finally US based-distributor IndiePix Films came on board for paving the way for a US release with 30 prints, all in non-NRI theatres, a rare feat for a Bollywood film. Meanwhile, the film was also sold in Scandinavian countries, Turkey, Southern Europe, and New Zealand. Its satellite rights were sold in many countries. The film thus became Kashyap's first worldwide release, as it was released in 40 US theatres on 2 September by IndiePix Films, on the same day of its India release. Previously, after its showing at the London Indian Film Festival, Britain-based Mara Pictures picked up the film there for UK release in last quarter of 2011. Kashyap later told BBC News that he received a negative backlash from financial backers because of the film's sexual content: "A lot of people involved with the film were embarrassed about the film. A lot of people we thanked in the film who actually lent us money, they said, 'Please take our names from the film,' because they don't want somebody to see and say 'You gave the money to make this film!'" That Girl in Yellow Boots is one of the few Indian films released without an interval.

Marketing
Prior to its India release, the first look of the film was unveiled to the press on 11 August 2011.
MTV India started a "That Girl with Yellow Boots contest" asking for audition tapes from aspiring actors, the winner of which would act in future Anurag Kashyap's films. In the run up to the film, its lead Kalki Koechlin appeared at an event, colour-coordinated, complete with yellow boots.

Critical reception
The film opened to mostly positive reviews. Roger Ebert of the Chicago Sun-times gave it 3.5 out of the 4 stars, and he also noted that ' The film's value is in its portrait of Ruth, and her independence as a solo outsider in a vast, uncaring city. '
In his Huffington Post review, Kia Makarechi wrote, "an unnervingly realistic portrait of unimaginable pain – is one with an ending you'll wish you could forget." Nupur Barua of fullhyd.com rated it 7 out of 10, and said that besides the Kashyap-esque tone of despair and melancholy, That Girl in Yellow Boots is Anurag Kashyap's best until date, adding that you can watch it "only if you can handle the unspeakable". Parmita Borah, on EF News International, wrote, "Kalki Koechlin carries That Girl in Yellow Boots on her shoulders and does so with great panache and élan." Shivesh Kumar of IndiaWeekly awarded the movie 3.5 out of 5 stars.

References

External links
 
 

2010 films
Indian thriller films
2010s Hindi-language films
Films shot in India
2010 thriller films
Films about drugs
Films directed by Anurag Kashyap
Films set in Mumbai
Incest in film
Films about missing people
Films with screenplays by Anurag Kashyap
Hindi-language thriller films